Chedli is both a given name and a surname. Notable people with the name include:

Adel Chedli (born 1976), Tunisian footballer
Chedli Klibi (1925–2020), Tunisian politician and former secretary general of the Arab League

See also
Stade Chedli Zouiten
CHED (disambiguation)